The White Cloud Mountains are part of the Rocky Mountains of the western United States, located in central Idaho, southeast of Stanley in Custer County. The range is located within the Sawtooth National Recreation Area (SNRA) and partially within the Cecil D. Andrus–White Clouds Wilderness.

The White Cloud Mountains are located on National Forest land, with numerous trails in the area. Camping is permitted anywhere on the national forest land and there are no fees to access the area. Primary access to the area is via State Highway 75, the Salmon River Scenic Byway, which accompanies the main Salmon River as it descends along the range's western and northern perimeter.

Peaks

Lakes
See List of lakes of the White Cloud Mountains

Mine proposal
In 1970, it was proposed that the White Cloud Mountains be the site of an open-pit mine. The proposal became a major issue in Idaho's 1970 gubernatorial election. Incumbent Republican governor Don Samuelson favored the mine, as it would generate an estimated $4 million in revenue to the state. However, his Democratic opponent, Cecil Andrus, opposed the mine on conservation grounds. His stance was backed by many of the state's urban residents, who enjoyed vacationing at the mountains. Andrus won the election by more than four points, and it has been suggested that Andrus's stance on the mine was a contributing factor to his victory, and in particular to his victories in the normally Republican-leaning urban parts of the state.

Photos

See also

References

External links
 Peak Bagger.com - White Cloud Mountains
 Visit Idaho.org - official state tourism site
 Idaho Summits.com - Castle Peak - 11,815 ft.

Ranges of the Rocky Mountains
Mountain ranges of Idaho
Landforms of Custer County, Idaho
Sawtooth National Forest